Nisbat-e-Rasooli is the name given to the Naqshbandia Sufi order of Islam that was first renamed and led by Pir Nazeer Ahmed (Pir is a Sufi honorific) at Mohra Sharif. Currently, this order is being led by his youngest son Pir Haroon al Rasheed.

Reason for renaming
Nazeer Ahmed described the reason for naming the order to be "The real purpose of Tareeqat is to follow the Prophet Muhammad in every aspect of life. This is the teaching that was given by all the pious saints of Islam. Abdul Qadir Jilani never called himself Qadri neither did Shahab al-Din Suhrawardi called himself Suhrawardi nor Baha-ud-Din Naqshband Bukhari called himself Naqshbandi. Similarly Abu Ishaq Shami never called himself Chishti. Rather the only message that these people gave was to follow Prophet Muhammad completely and in every aspect of one's life. These names were given to these orders by the people who came later and in due course of time unfortunately they all fell victim to prejudice. So much so that they started to mock others and hence Tareeqat that was meant to promote brotherhood became a tool for propagating hatred. Since we do not want to indulge in all these minor differences and want to focus on the main objective of following Prophet Muhammad in every aspect of our lives, thus we call our order Nisbat-e-Rasooli."

History
Nisbat-e-Rasooli formerly originated after the death of Muhammad Qasim Sadiq in 1943. According to the followers of the order, Muhammad Qasim Sadiq publicly appointed his eldest son Nazeer Ahmed his successor in 1925; however, familial disputes arose after his death and the order at Mohra Sharif split into two. Nazeer Ahmed later renamed the order to Nisbat-e-Rasooli for the reason mentioned above. Nazeer Ahmed led the order till his death on 22 July 1960. He appointed his youngest son Haroon al Rasheed as his successor formally through a letter to the President of Pakistan Muhammad Ayub Khan. Since 28 August 1960, Haroon al Rasheed is leading the order. During a speech in 1998, Haroon al Rasheed appointed his eldest son Ghulam Muhammad Gauhar Nazeer his successor.

Ideology
The founder of the order Nazeer Ahmed described the ideology of the order to be that a "Real example of following the Prophet Muhammad can be found in his companions, most notably the first four Caliphs. And that is where every Muslim shall try to be at. With the passage of time, different variations start appearing that can be exemplified as when you throw a stone in the water. Stone being at the center creates ripples that spread in circles around it and keep on moving further away. All these variations are like those ripple currents that although centered around the stone, are in fact away from it. We want to put our focus on the stone (center) rather than getting bogged by the ripples. This is why we call our order Nisbat-e-Rasooli."

Religious festivals
Twice a year public religious congregations are announced and held in Mohra Sharif to commemorate its leaders and their teachings. The first meeting is held around early June to commemorate the founder of the order, Nazeer Ahmed, Khwaja Nizam ud Din, and Abdul Qadir Jilani. Every 23 July a congregation, open to the public but not announced, is held for Quran recitation on the anniversary of the death of Nazeer Ahmed. The second meeting is held around early November in commemoration of Muhammad Qasim Sadiq and Sheikh Ahmad Sirhindi.

References
 http://nisbatrasooli.com/
 http://www.mohrasharif.com.pk
 https://web.archive.org/web/20100130141901/http://www.nisbat-e-rasooli.info/
 Sufi Muhammad Rasheed (2006). Nisbat-e-Rasooli.  Maktaba Nisbat-e-Rasooli.

Naqshbandi order
Sufi shrines
Ziyarat